Robin McKie is a writer known for his journalism in The Observer, a publication for which he has served as science editor. As a result of his work, he has won awards from organizations such as the Medical Journalists’ Association, reviving a citation in early 2014 for a feature on zebra fish research. He additionally got named as "Science and Technology Journalist of the Year" during the U.K. Press Gazette Awards for 2013.

In addition he has written numerous books with a view to expanding popular interest in and understanding of biological science.

Background and personal life
McKie resides in London, England.

He is an alumnus of Glasgow University, having studied mathematics and psychology at the institution.

See also

List of University of Glasgow people
Science journalism

References

21st-century British journalists
Writers from London
British male journalists
British science journalists
Living people
Year of birth missing (living people)
Alumni of the University of Glasgow
The Observer people